Park Square is a major roundabout in Sheffield, England. The Sheffield Parkway, a major road from M1 Junction 33, terminates here. It is located next to Ponds Forge and Victoria Quays.

It is also a major tram junction connecting to the Park Square Bridge, and has many pedestrian bridges.

Roads running into Park Square
Clockwise from  the North-East:

Sheffield Parkway (A57)
Broad Street (B6071)
Duke Street (A6135)
Sheaf Street (A61)
Commercial Street (A621)
Broad Street
Exchange Place (A61)

Squares in Sheffield
Roundabouts in England